Hiroshi Kawaguchi (川口 浩, 22 August 1936 – 17 November 1987) was a Japanese film actor. He appeared in more than 50 films between 1956 and 1986. He was born in Tokyo, Japan. Kawaguchi's father, writer Matsutarō Kawaguchi, was an executive at Daiei Film, where Kawaguchi acted. In 1960 he married Daiei actress Hitomi Nozoe.

Partial filmography

 Niji ikutabi (1956) - Kazuhiko Takemiya
 Punishment Room (1956) - Katsumi Shimada
 Studio wa ôsawagi (1956)
 Tsukigata Hanpeita: Hana no maki; Arashi no maki (1956) - Sango Atobe
 Yonjû-hassai no teikô (1956) - Takashi, Kotaro's son
 The Crowded Streetcar (1957) - Tamio Moroi
 Nagasugita haru (1957) - Ikuo Takarabe
 Kisses (1957, directed by Yasuzo Masumura) - Kinichi Miyamoto
 Chijo (1957) - Heiichiro Okawa
 Yūrakuchō de Aimashō (有楽町で逢いましょう) (lit. Lovers in Yurakucho aka Let's Meet in Yurakuchô) (1958) - Takeshi Koyanagi
 Edokko matsuri (1958) - Takechiyo
 The Loyal 47 Ronin (忠臣蔵 Chūshingura) (1958) - Chikara Ōishi
 Aiga (1958)
 Haha (1958) - Eizô Yuasa
 Giants and Toys (1958) - Yôsuke Nishi
 The Lowest Man (1958)
 Futeki na otoko (1958) - Saburô Tateno
 Oyafukô dôri (1958) - Katsuya Sotozaki
 Musume no boken (1958)
 Anata to watashi no aikotoba: Sayônara, konnichiwa (1959) - Kataoka
 Saikô shukun fujin (1959) - Saburo Mihara
 Yoru no togyo (1959) - Hideo Kawashibara
 Bibô ni tsumi ari (1959) - Tadao Shimizu
 Floating Weeds (1959) - Kiyoshi Homma
 Yami o yokogire (1959) - Kunio Ishizuka
 Sexy sign suki suki suki (1960) - Ryôtarô Yamazaki
 Jokyo (1960) - Tabata
 Onna wa teikô suru (1960) - Akira Kuji, the singer
 Shôri to haiboku (1960) - Muneo Yamanaka
 Sure-sure (1960)
 San'nin no kaoyaku (1960) - Shûkichi Môri
 Her Brother (1960) - Hekiro
 San kyôdai no kettô (1960)
 Ginzakko monogatari (1961) - Yûji Takarai
 Ojôsan (1961) - Keiichi Sawai
 Gonin no totsugeki tai (1961) - Pvt. First Class Hashimoto
 Tokyo onigiri musume (1961) - Gorô Shirai
 Nyobo gakko (1961)
 A Wife Confesses (1961) - Osamu Kôda
 Buddha (1961) - Ajātasattu
 Urusai imôtotachi (1961) - Kenji
 Wakai yatsura no kaidan (1961) - Fujiwara
 Shin jinsei gekijô (1961)
 Onna wa yoru kesshô suru (1961)
 Onna no tsurihashi (1961) - Yôji (Episode 1)
 Katei no jijô (1962) - Kazutaka Hirose
 Kurotokage (1962) - Jun Amemiya
 Heiten jikan (1962) - Makoto Ubukata
 Hoseki dorobo (1962) - Kenichi Tachibana
 The Great Wall (1962) - Hsi Liang
 Konto Gojugo-go: Uchu daibôken (1969) - Doguma
 Yoru no têkubari shi: sûke chi hitokirî (1971)
 Kawaguchi Hiroshi　Tankentai　（川口浩探検隊、Explorer ＆ Adventurer Kawaguchi Hiroshi 1978-1985, TV Series
 Kurasshâ Jô (1983) - Control Room Officer (voice)
 Arion (1986) - (voice)
 Venus Senki (1989) - Tao (voice)

References

External links

1936 births
1987 deaths
Deaths from cancer in Japan
Japanese male film actors
Japanese racehorse owners and breeders
Male actors from Tokyo
20th-century Japanese male actors